Malefice was an English heavy metal band from Reading, Berkshire, formed in 2003. They disbanded in 2017.

History 
The original members consisted of college friends Dale Butler, Alex Vuskans, Craig Thomas and Craig Fenner. After formation they began writing their songs straight away.  Their first major break was to open a four band bill charity gig at the Rivermead Centre in Reading.  Henceforth their fanbase began to grow.  Through constant touring around Reading and London, they managed to get a distribution deal for their first EP Relentless through Hangman's Joke.

Then in early 2007 they signed to Anticulture Records.  They then recorded their debut album Entities under the production team of Dan Weller and Justin Hill of WellerHill at Craig's parents home in South Wales.  The album has been highly praised by the British metal press . The band eventually announced their amicable split from the Anticulture label via their Myspace page.

Since the album's release they have been support for the successful SikTh tour as well as DevilDriver and God Forbid and have played shows with the likes of Soulfly.

In January 2008, they played a show at The Wedgewood Rooms in Portsmouth, which was recorded, and is due to be released as the band's first ever DVD.

In June 2008, Malefice opened the second stage of the prestigious Download Festival on the Saturday.

November 2008, Malefice announced through their  Myspace page that they had signed a worldwide deal with Metal Blade Records. In February 2009 they released their second album Dawn of Reprisal. On 12 September, they played at Butserfest alongside Go:Audio and We Are the Ocean.

On 26 September 2009, they played in India at the annual cultural fest Rendezvous of IIT Delhi.

In March 2010 the band featured on the BBC TV show "The Bubble". The following month it was announced that drummer Craig Thomas had left the band, to be replaced by Chris Allan-Whyte.
Following this Malefice also played on the Jager stage at Sonisphere UK, playing a 30-minute set on Saturday evening. In 2012 they recorded a song with Everton goalkeeper Marcus Hahnemann for the Jägermeister UK "Ice Cold Session", titled Omega and released on 1 February 2012.

In June 2012, the band signed to Transcend Music.

In March 2017, the group disbanded, in order to pursue solo careers.

Band members

Current members 
 Dale Butler – vocals (2003–2017)
 Ben Symons – guitar (2003–2017)
 Tom Hynes – bass (2006–2017)
 Andrew Wilson – guitar (2011–2017)
 James Cook – drums (2014–2017)

Former members 
 Lloyd Griffiths – bass (2003–2006)
 Craig Thomas – drums (2003–2010)
 Alex Vuskans – guitar(2003–2011)
 Chris Allan-Whyte – drums (2010–2014)

Timeline

Discography

Studio albums and EPs 
 2006 – Relentless (Hangmans Joke)
 2007 – Entities (Anticulture Records)
 2009 – Dawn of Reprisal (Metal Blade Records)
 2011 – Awaken the Tides (Metal Blade Records)
 2013 – Five (Transcend Music)

Promotional videos 
 2006 – "The Force That You Fear"
 2007 – "Risen Through the Ashes"
 2009 – "An Architect of Your Demise"
 2011 – "Awaken the Tides"
 2012 – "Omega" (feat. Marcus Hahnemann)
 2013 – "V"
 2013 – "Blueprints"
 2014 – "Heroes"

References

External links 

  Malefice TV on YouTube

British alternative metal musical groups
English heavy metal musical groups
Musical groups established in 2003
Musical groups from Reading, Berkshire
Metal Blade Records artists